Tim Rollinson may refer to:
 Tim Rollinson (musician)
 Tim Rollinson (civil servant)